The 1987 1. divisjon, the highest women's football (soccer) league in Norway, began on 2 May 1987 and ended on 3 October 1987.

It was the first season with a single, nationwide league for women.

18 games were played with 3 points given for wins, whereas drawn matches were decided with a penalty shootout, with 2 points for a shootout victory and 1 point for a shootout loss.

Number nine and ten were relegated, while two teams from the 2. divisjon were promoted through a playoff round.

Klepp won the league, having taken the lead as late as the seventeenth round.

League table

Top goalscorers
 14 goals:
  Lisbeth Bakken, Sprint/Jeløy
 13 goals:
  Elisabeth Grindheim, Sandviken
 12 goals:
  Sissel Grude, Klepp
  Turid Storhaug, Klepp
 11 goals:
  Inger Knuten, Asker
 10 goals:
  Trude Stendal, Sandviken
 9 goals:
  Kari Nielsen, Asker
  Laila Rognhaug, Bøler
  Mai-Heidi Aas, Grand
 7 goals:
  Sissel Grude, Klepp
  Kristin Henriksen, Sprint/Jeløy
  Torill Hoch-Nielsen, Sprint/Jeløy

Promotion and relegation
 Troll and Grand were relegated to the Second Division.
 Jardar and Heimdal were promoted from the Second Division through playoff.

References

League table
Fixtures
Goalscorers

Norwegian First Division (women) seasons
Top level Norwegian women's football league seasons
women
Nor
Nor